The Winterle House (also known as Three Stars) is a historic home in Tallahassee, Florida, United States. It is located at 1111 Paul Russell Road. On February 17, 1998, it was added to the U.S. National Register of Historic Places.

References

External links
 Leon County listings at National Register of Historic Places

Historic buildings and structures in Leon County, Florida
Houses on the National Register of Historic Places in Florida
National Register of Historic Places in Tallahassee, Florida
History of Tallahassee, Florida
Houses in Tallahassee, Florida